Shock Treatment is a TV film in 1995. The film was directed by Michael Schultz. It received one nomination for best visual effects  in 1996 at the Gemini Awards.

Cast

Matthew Walker ....  The Shock
Corey Carrier ....  Jake Grant
David Eisner ....  Jake's Dad
Mark Hildreth ....  Craig Grant
Eric Murphy ....  Joe Garrison
Benjamin Plener ....  Tommy Blizzard
Caterina Scorsone ....  Robyn Belmore
Gwynyth Walsh ....  Jake's Mom

External links

1995 films
American television films
Films directed by Michael Schultz